Giacomo Pierbon (born 2 July 1987) is an Italian alpine skier.

Career 

He made his Deaflympic debut representing Italy at the 2015 Winter Deaflympics. He was successful on his maiden appearance claiming a total of five medals including three gold medals in men's super combined, Super-G and slalom events. He also represented Italy at the 2019 Winter Deaflympics which is coincidentally held in his home nation Italy and managed to claim five gold medals in men's alpine skiing categories.

References 

1987 births
Living people
Italian male alpine skiers
Deaf skiers
Deaflympic alpine skiers of Italy
Deaflympic gold medalists for Italy
Deaflympic silver medalists for Italy
Medalists at the 2015 Winter Deaflympics
Medalists at the 2019 Winter Deaflympics
Alpine skiers at the 2015 Winter Deaflympics
Alpine skiers at the 2019 Winter Deaflympics
Italian deaf people